The 2015–16 Southern Counties East Football League season was the 50th in the history of the Southern Counties East Football League (the 3rd since it was renamed from the Kent Football League), a football competition in England. At the end of the season, the league merged with the Kent Invicta League with the latter becoming the lower division of the merged league.

League table

The league consisted of 17 clubs from the previous season along with two new clubs:
AFC Croydon Athletic, promoted from Combined Counties League Division One
Hollands & Blair, promoted from the Kent Invicta League

Six clubs applied for promotion to Step 4: AFC Croydon Athletic, Ashford United, Beckenham Town, Corinthian, Greenwich Borough and Hollands & Blair.

League table

Results

Top scorers
Correct as of 30 April 2016

References

2015–16
9